Laindon railway station is on the London, Tilbury and Southend line, serving the Laindon area of the borough of Basildon, Essex. Its three-letter station code is LAI.

The station and all trains serving it are currently operated by c2c.

Description
The main ticket office is located on Station Approach. It has two serving positions. A second smaller ticket office is located at the bottom of the stairs that lead to two of the platforms, though this is open only on weekdays.

The station has three platforms. Platforms 1 and 2 are the two faces of an island platform, accessed via a footbridge from outside the main ticket office. Platform 1 is the London-bound platform and platform 2 is a reversing platform which can be used to divert trains from one line to the other. Platform 3 is the -bound platform, reached from Station Approach via the main ticket office.

Services 

The typical Monday-Friday off-peak service pattern is:
 2 trains per hour to London Fenchurch Street;
 2 trains per hour to Shoeburyness via .

Joan Sims
British actress Joan Sims (1930–2001), famous for her roles in the Carry On films, grew up in the station house at Laindon railway station where her father was the station master. A plaque in her memory can be seen near the entrance.

References

External links

Railway stations in Essex
DfT Category C2 stations
Former London, Tilbury and Southend Railway stations
Railway stations in Great Britain opened in 1888
Transport in the Borough of Basildon
Railway stations served by c2c